Antônio Carlos Moreno (born 11 June 1948) is a Brazilian former volleyball player who competed in the 1968 Summer Olympics, in the 1972 Summer Olympics, in the 1976 Summer Olympics, and in the 1980 Summer Olympics.

References

1948 births
Living people
Brazilian men's volleyball players
Olympic volleyball players of Brazil
Volleyball players at the 1968 Summer Olympics
Volleyball players at the 1972 Summer Olympics
Volleyball players at the 1976 Summer Olympics
Volleyball players at the 1980 Summer Olympics
Pan American Games medalists in volleyball
Pan American Games silver medalists for Brazil
Volleyball players at the 1967 Pan American Games
Medalists at the 1967 Pan American Games